Coprinellus pyrrhanthes is a species of mushroom in the family Psathyrellaceae. First described as Coprinus pyrrhanthes by the mycologist Henri Romagnesi in 1951, it was later transferred to the genus Coprinellus in 2001.

References

pyrrhanthes
Fungi described in 1951